Elevenses  is a short break taken at around 11:00a.m. to consume a drink or snack. The names and details vary among countries.

Regional variations

Australia and New Zealand
In Australia and New Zealand, elevenses is known as "morning tea" and occurs at approximately 10:30am. Many workplaces organize morning teas for staff to welcome new employees, for special occasions such as a birthday, or simply as a regular event. Food will sometimes be provided by the business, but often employees will be expected to bring food to share.

Farmers, shearers and tradespeople in both countries often refer to this mid-morning break as Smoko.

Belgium 

In Flemish, this kind of snack is called a tienuurtje, literally a "little (one of) 10 o'clock". A tienuurtje typically consists of one or more cookies or some piece of fruit and may be accompanied by fruit juice or chocolate milk. Many parents give their children a tienuurtje to eat during the mid-morning school break.
A similar kind of snack for the afternoon break is called a vieruurtje, literally "little (one of) 4 o'clock".

Chile
In many Spanish-speaking cultures, elevenses is observed under the name las once or la once (in Spanish, once means 'eleven'). However, in Chile it has shifted to the afternoon, sometimes replacing the traditional dinner.

In the 2010–2011 National Food Consumption Survey, around 80% of the Chileans reported having once. This is due to once sometimes replacing the traditional dinner in Chile, which only 30% of the population reported having. Here, traditional dinner means a proper meal with vegetables, meat, poultry and fish. La once resembles a light version of British High Tea.

An alternative widespread, but unfounded, popular etymology for the word in Chile is that priests (in other versions, workers or women) used the phrase tomar las once (Spanish: "drink the eleven") in reference to the eleven letters of the word Aguardiente to conceal the fact that they were drinking during the day.

Colombia

In Colombia, it is common to have a snack named onces. It consists mainly of hot chocolate or coffee  with arepa, bread, or crackers, usually taken around 5:00 p.m. In the morning, the snack consist of the same type of food but it is called medias nueves. It is served generally between 9:00 and 11:00.

Hungary 
Elevenses in Hungarian is called Tíz-órai which translates to "of the 10 o'clock", referring to "the meal of the 10 o'clock". This is a break between breakfast and lunch, when it is time for a light meal or snack. In schools the early lunch break is called a Tíz-órai break.  Parallel to the word Elevenses, Tíz-órai is often called Tenses "Tenzeez" by Hungarian-Americans and Hungarian-Britons.

India 
In certain parts of rural India, especially in northern states like Punjab, it is a usual practice to take tea break after couple of hours of breakfast. When the practice began, there was no set clock and break is usually between 10-11am, so it was named after 10am, as "Das-Baja" (means 10 o'clock tea).

This practice is slowly getting obsolete in fast moving world of cities and towns, but rural area breaks for the workers in fields is still very popular.

Israel
In Israel it is called ארוחת עשר (arukhat eser, Hebrew for "10 o'clock meal"), mostly eaten at schools and kindergartens in the form of homemade sandwiches, often accompanied with a fruit or other snack, after the second hour of the school day and before the so-called "small break". It also occurs in major unionized workplaces, such as factories and customer services reception centres, where workers are handed tea.

Netherlands
In West Friesland country people had a similar meal called konkelstik (served at konkeltoid, the proper time for konkelen, a verb denoting "making a visit").

Poland
In Poland the drugie śniadanie (lit. "second breakfast") is eaten in the midmorning. Rather than a heavy chunk of sausage or other meat, though, like the German second breakfast, Poles prefer a lighter, dessert-like pastry or sweet with a hot drink, more similar to the American "coffee break".

Slovakia
In Slovakia, desiata (lit. "tenth", from "tenth hour") can be eaten at or around 10 a.m. It usually consists of a small snack, fruit, or a sandwich, i.e. a lighter meal, so as not to fill the stomach before lunch. In schools, the break between classes around 10 a.m. is referred to as desiatová prestávka (lit. "tenth break", or "break for the tenth") and may be a few minutes longer than other breaks, to give the students time to eat their desiata. Note: although the word desiata is grammatically an ordinal numeral, it is treated as a noun in this context.

Spain
In Spain it is not rare to have a short meal break around 11:00a.m., particularly in jobs of intense physical activity; this can range from a hot drink paired with light snacks like pastries to a sandwich, scrambled eggs or a piece of Spanish omelette (also known as a pincho). This meal is sometimes known as almuerzo, although this word is used inconsistently and often just means lunch. Also note lunch time in Spain can be as late as 3:00 p.m., which conditions mid-morning customs.

In the Basque Country in particular it is common to have a mid-morning snack consisting of high-protein food like eggs, bacon, or cured meat on bread, called hamarretako (literally "10 o'clock (snack)") or hamaiketako ("11 o'clock (snack)").

Sweden 
In Sweden, it is common to drink coffee at 11:00, elvakaffe (lit. coffee at eleven), often with a few biscuits or a light sandwich.

Switzerland 
In Switzerland, there is a Znüni ("(Meal) at nine", following the nomenclature of Breakfast (Zmorge), Lunch (Zmittag), afternoon snack at four (Zvieri) and Dinner (Znacht)). The name, despite referring to a specific time, stays the same no matter the actual time of the snack break; especially in schools, it is usually at 10am.

United Kingdom

Elevenses, eaten at 11:00 as the name suggests, typically consists of tea or coffee, often with a few biscuits. Sometimes, cake or other snacks are eaten instead.

United States
During the first decades of the 19th century, elevenses consisted of drinking whiskey. In modern times, hourly workers take a break known as a coffee break, typically around 10:00a.m., or in the first third of a work shift Often, this is done in a break room, and small snacks may be eaten as well.

It is common for school children to have a short snack break called morning snack. This is offered in the morning before lunch, usually between 9:00 and 11:00.

In popular culture
For elevenses, Winnie-the-Pooh preferred honey on bread with condensed milk. Paddington Bear often took elevenses at the antique shop on Portobello Road run by his friend Mr Gruber, for which Paddington would buy buns and Mr Gruber would make cocoa (hot chocolate).

In the Middle-earth stories by J. R. R. Tolkien (The Lord of the Rings), a party is implied to be particularly lavish in that food was served "continuously from elevenses until six-thirty".

See also
 Second breakfast 
 Break (work)
 Tea (meal)
 Fika (coffee break)

References

External links
 
 

Breakfast
Meals
Tea culture